Jan Olov Ferdinand Sandquist (born 6 August 1932) is a Swedish journalist.

Career
Sandquist was born in Stockholm, Sweden and was the son of Ferdinand Sandquist and Anna (née Hjort). He was a journalist at Mariestads-Tidningen in Mariestad in 1949, Västergötlands Annonsblad in 1953 and Göteborgs-Tidningen in 1955. Sandqvist worked in the press office at Vattenfall in 1960 and was a freelance journalist in South America from 1964 to 1967. He was foreign correspondent in South America for Sveriges Radio from 1968 to 1974.

On 29 June 1973 Sandquist and his colleague Leonardo Henrichsen were in Santiago de Chile to do a report on the risk of a coup d'état known as the Tanquetazo, a prelude to the coup on September 11 the same year. Sandqvist and Henrichsen had together covered 16 coups in Latin America and had been shot at several times. While filming the events outside La Moneda Palace, Henrichsen and Sandquist were fired at and Henrichsen was fatally shot by a soldier before collapsing in the arms of Sandquist. Sandqvist later said that the tragic event in Santiago de Chile was the most shocking of his career.

Sandquist returned to Sweden in 1974 to be the host of Rapport in TV2, a position he stayed in until 1979. Sandquist was then foreign correspondent in United States from 1979 to 1982 and employee of the Rapport editorial team from 1982 to 1983. He was district manager in Örebro from 1983 to 1986 and communications manager at SIDA from 1986.

Sandquist, good friend with ambassador Harald Edelstam, has written two books about Edelstam's life together with Germán Perotti.

Personal life
Sandquist was married 1954-69 to journalist Marianne Sandberg (born 1931), the daughter of skipper Gustaf Lindgren and Hilma (née Almroth). He remarried in 1971 to Kerstin Ahlström (born 1937), the daughter of captain Sven Ahlström and the artist Lena (née Malmberg).

Bibliography

References

External links
 
 

1932 births
Living people
20th-century Swedish journalists
Journalists from Stockholm